Kei Koizumi may refer to:

 Kei Koizumi, Japanese footballer
 Kei Koizumi (science policymaker), American government official